Sipke Jan Bousema (Dokkum, 15 August 1976) is a Dutch presenter and actor. Bousema made his television debut in January 1999 at Teleac/NOT as the presenter for Schooltv Weekjournaal.

Career
In the past he has presented many programmes for AVRO including Museumbende, ZipZoo: coordinate X and ZipZoo: WorldWide. Since 2004 he has been a voice-over on Heartbeat VIPS.

In 2003, Bousema played the role of student Joris van Kampen in De Schippers van de Kameleon. In 2005, he presented the premiere of Kameleon 2 as well as having his own TV drama Sipke Jan and the Mystery of the Magical Ball. The show was a success and in January 2006 it was repeated two times.

Since 2002 Bousema has been an ambassador for UNICEF.

Bousema presented the Dutch TV show, Junior Songfestival, to select a contestant for the Junior Eurovision Song Contest 2006 and presented the Junior Eurovision Song Contest 2007 in Rotterdam alongside Kim-Lian van der Meij. Bousema later provided commentary for the 2008 contest in Lemesos, 2009 in Kyiv and the 2010 contest in Minsk.

External links

Official site
 

1976 births
Living people
Dutch gay actors
Dutch television presenters
People from Dokkum
UNICEF Goodwill Ambassadors